Kulahath Sisira Jayawilal de Abrew is a sitting Puisne Justice of the Supreme Court of Sri Lanka who was appointed by President Mahinda Rajapaksa in 2014 to replace Justice Nimal Gamini Amaratunga. In May 2016 de Abrew was appointed to the Judicial Service Commission by President Maithripala Sirisena.

de Abrew comes from a Buddhist family in Ratmalana, Western Province, Sri Lanka. He had his early education at Dharmasoka College and graduated to the Sri Lanka Law College in 1978. He was called to the Bar in 1981. de Abrew joined the Attorney General's Department in 1982 and was promoted as senior state counsel in 1996. In 1998 he was appointed a High Court Judge, where he served in Ampara, Kandy, Anuradhapura and Colombo. In 2005 he was appointed as a Judge of the Court of Appeal of Sri Lanka, and soon became the President of the Court.

References

Puisne Justices of the Supreme Court of Sri Lanka
Presidents of the Court of Appeal of Sri Lanka
Court of Appeal of Sri Lanka judges
High Courts of Sri Lanka judges
Sinhalese judges
Sinhalese lawyers
20th-century Sri Lankan people
21st-century Sri Lankan people
Alumni of Sri Lanka Law College
Alumni of Dharmasoka College
Living people
Year of birth missing (living people)